Michael Jones (1942 – 19 January 2022) was a British-born Canadian new-age pianist and composer, known for his improvisational new age performance style. He was also a writer and leadership educator.

Personal life
Jones was born in Surrey, England, and grew up in Kitchener and later Queenston, Ontario. He died on 19 January 2022, at the age of 79.

Career
Jones' first album, Pianoscapes, was released on the newly formed Narada record label. The album sold more than 100,000 copies. Since then he has released more than a dozen albums of piano music.  In 1990 he conducted a concert tour.

He published three books about creative leadership; the most recent is  The Soul of Place: Re-imagining Leadership Through Nature Art and Community. Jones was a columnist for the business and leadership website, Management - Issues. He often combined the two sides of his career by performing his compositions at leadership conferences.

In 2015 Jones co-chaired the Mariposa Roundtable, an initiative to improve the economy of Orillia through increased tourism.

Original discography 
Michael's Music (Pianoscapes, 1981)
 Reissued as Pianoscapes (Narada, 1983)
Windsong (Antiquity, 1983)
Seascapes (Narada, 1984)
Wind and Whispers (Sona Gaia, 1985)
Solstice (Narada, 1985)
Sunscapes (Narada, 1986)
Amber (Narada, 1987)
After the Rain (Narada, 1988)
Magical Child (Narada, 1990)
Michael's Music (Narada, 1990)
Morning in Medonte (Narada, 1992)
Air Born (Narada, 1994)
Touch (Narada, 1996)
The Living Music (Narada, 1998)
Echoes of Childhood ( Pianoscapes, 2002)
Almost Home (Pianoscapes, 2006)
Deep Song (Pianoscapes, 2015)

Compilation appearances
The Living Music (Narada 1998)
20 Years of Narada Piano
Grand Piano (Narada Anniversary Collection)
Pianoscapes The Deluxe Edition (Narada 2002)

Books 

Creating an Imaginative Life Trafford (1995, 2006) 
Artful Leadership, Awakening the Commons of the Imagination Trafford  (2006) 
The Soul of Place:Re-Imagining Leadership Through Nature, Art and Community Friesen Press (2014)

See also 
List of ambient music artists

References

External links

 
 Pianoscapes
 Thesoulofplace

1942 births
2022 deaths
21st-century Canadian male musicians
21st-century Canadian pianists
Canadian male pianists
Musicians from Ontario
Canadian composers
Canadian male composers
Composers for piano
New-age pianists
Narada Productions artists